Poynter Col is a snow-filled col, over 700 m high, joining Poynter Hill and Ivory Pinnacles in northern Graham Land, Antarctica. The col is 9 nautical miles (17 km) east-southeast of Cape Kjellman. It was charted by the Falkland Islands Dependencies Survey (FIDS) from Hope Bay in 1948. Poynter Col was named in 1953 by the United Kingdom Antarctic Place-Names Committee (UK-APC), by association with Poynter Hill.

Gazetteer of the British Antarctic Territory ID: 110699 
United States Gazetteer ID: 130323

References

External links
Ivory Pinnacles and Poynter Col at Mapcarta — Interactive map

Davis Coast
Mountain passes of Graham Land